Kathanayakuni Katha is a 1975 Indian Telugu-language action drama film, produced by K. Devi Vara Prasad under the Tarakarama Pictures banner and directed by D. Yoganand. It stars N. T. Rama Rao and Vanisri, with music composed by K. V. Mahadevan.

Plot
The film begins in a village, where Ramu (N. T. Rama Rao) a valiant loaf, suffers his foster mother Pullatla Tayaramma (G. Varalakshmi). Besides,  Lalitha (Vanisri) sister of malicious Zamidar Phani Bhushan Rao (Satyanarayana) be sweet on Ramu's innocence and falls for him. Right now, Ramu reaches Phani Bhushan Rao with the marriage proposal when he is badly humiliated. So, Ramu aims to handout Rs.1 lakh to Phani Bhushan Rao for acquiring Lalitha. Forthwith, he moves for the city where he acquainted with a dumb girl Lakshmi (Srividya) whom he nurtures as a sister. Parallelly, Phani Bhushan Rao decides Lalitha's alliance with a film star Suresh (Prabhakar Reddy). So, Lalitha escapes and lands at the city in search of Ramu. After some time, the wheel of fortune makes Ramu a top gun in the film industry. Just as, he backs for Lalitha when Phani Bhushan Rao falsifies him with her death. Knowing it, Ramu collapses when his co-artist Madhuri (Bharathi) consoles him and Tayaramma aspires to knit them. Here, fortuitously, Lalitha returns which envy Suresh, so, he approaches Phani Bhushan Rao. Before long, Phani Bhushan Rao ploys by reconciling with Ramu's family and molests Lakshmi. Later, he intimidates Lalitha to wed Suresh which she agrees. Meanwhile, Parvathamma (Pandari Bai) mother of Suresh recognizes Ramu as her detached son by his birthmark. During, Suresh attempts forcibly to couple up Lalitha when Ramu rescues her and in the combat, Parvathamma is wounded while guarding Ramu against harm who divulges the actuality. At last, Suresh & Phani Bhushan Rai realize their mistake. Finally, the movie ends on a happy note with the marriage of Ramu & Lalitha.

Cast
N. T. Rama Rao as Ramu
Vanisri as Lalitha 
Satyanarayana as Phanibhushanam
Prabhakar Reddy as Suresh
Raja Babu as Babu
Mikkilineni as Rangaiah 
Allu Ramalingaiah as Sankharaiah 
Pandari Bai as Parvathi 
G. Varalakshmi as Pulatla Tayaramma
Bharathi as Madhuri
Rama Prabha as Nanchari
Hemalatha as herself 
Chaya Devi as Chayadevi 
Srividya as Lakshmi

Soundtrack

Music composed by K. V. Mahadevan.

References

External links

Indian action drama films
1970s action drama films
1970s Telugu-language films